Tattyreagh (from  meaning "the striped/tabby field") is a small townland near Seskinore in County Tyrone, Northern Ireland, and is situated within Omagh District Council area.

Over the past 5 years, rapid growth has emerged in this small rural community with new private housing. It consists of mainly residential houses and farms, one RC school- Sacred Heart PS, Tattyreagh St. Patrick's Gaelic Athletic Association club, Darcy Park, and a public house. Cutting through the area is one main road leading from Omagh to Fintona.

References

Townlands of County Tyrone
Omagh District Council